Elections for all Council seats in the London Borough of Richmond upon Thames were held on 6 May 2010.  The 2010 General Election and other local elections in England took place on the same day.

In London council elections the entire council is elected every four years.

Summary of results

References

2010
2010 London Borough council elections
May 2010 events in the United Kingdom